Aşağıbelemedik is a village in the District of Karaisalı, Adana Province, Turkey.

Population

Geography 
The village is 55 km from Adana and 5 km from the Karaisalı district.

References

Villages in Karaisalı District